Nicola Louise Roxon (born 1 April 1967) is a former Australian politician, who was a member of the House Representatives representing the seat of Gellibrand in Victoria for the Australian Labor Party from the 1998 federal election until her retirement in August 2013. Between 2011 and 2013, Roxon was the first female Attorney-General of Australia. Roxon is currently an adjunct professor at Victoria University and Chair of the board at VicHealth (Victoria Health Promotion Foundation).

Early and personal life
Roxon was born in Sydney, New South Wales. She is the second of three daughters and the niece of the late Australian journalist and Sydney Push member Lillian Roxon. Her paternal grandparents were Jewish and migrated from Poland to Australia in 1937. Anglicising the family name from Ropschitz to Roxon, her grandfather worked as a GP in Gympie and Brisbane, Queensland. Her mother Lesley trained as a pharmacist, while her father Jack was a microbiologist. He was a strong influence in her life and she was devastated by his death from cancer when she was 10 years old.

Roxon was educated at the Methodist Ladies' College in the suburb of Kew in Melbourne, Victoria. She studied for a Bachelor of Arts and Bachelor of Laws at the University of Melbourne, winning the university medal for law. She ultimately came to the view that "governments have got a role to make sure they can help people in circumstances they can't control—either through their health failing or an accident".

Between 1992 and 1994, Roxon was employed as a judge's associate to High Court Justice Mary Gaudron. She then became involved with the trade union movement, joining the National Union of Workers as an organiser. Roxon was also an industrial lawyer and senior associate with the law firm Maurice Blackburn and Co. from 1996 to 1998.

Political career

Roxon was elected to the comfortably safe Labor seat of Gellibrand in 1998, succeeding longtime member Ralph Willis.

She served on a number of committees, including the Standing Committee on Industry, Science and Resources and the Joint Select Committee on the Republic Referendum.

Roxon was promoted to the Shadow Ministry after Labor's loss in the 2001 election. Initially, she was appointed Shadow Minister for Child Care, Family Support and Youth. Roxon then had a brief stint as Shadow Minister for Population and Immigration later that year, when Julia Gillard moved from the Immigration portfolio to Health. In 2003, new leader Mark Latham appointed her shadow Attorney-General and Shadow Minister Assisting the Leader on the Status of Women.  She remained as Shadow Attorney-General following Latham's election loss in the 2004 election, holding this position until 2006. Kevin Rudd appointed her to the position of Shadow Health Minister upon his elevation to the Labor leadership in December 2006, and she retained the portfolio when Labor won government, replacing Tony Abbott as Minister for Health and Ageing.

Roxon made headlines during the 2007 federal election campaign when, on 31 October 2007, then Health Minister Tony Abbott arrived half an hour late for a televised debate. After apologising on behalf of the absent party to the audience of media and health industry figures, Roxon had the debate to herself and made light of the situation by stating that her staff felt she did a good impersonation of Abbott and could play his part. When Abbott arrived, he apologised for being late, but swore at Roxon when she claimed he could have been on time if he had wanted to.

Minister for Health
In February 2009, Roxon attempted to introduce legislation backing the alcopops tax increase into parliament.

In 2010, Roxon aimed to introduce major health reform in Australia. She said the Government would hold a referendum on hospital reform even if the Senate rejected the idea.

In 2012, Roxon was featured in the Australian Story television program in an episode entitled "Kicking The Habit", about her advocacy for plain cigarette packaging.

Attorney-General
Prime Minister Julia Gillard implemented a major change to her Cabinet on 14 December 2011.  Roxon was promoted from Health and Ageing to become Australia's first woman to serve as Attorney-General. In a reshuffle announced on 2 March 2012, Roxon was given the additional portfolio of Emergency Management. She was sworn into that portfolio on 5 March.

In May 2012, Attorney-General Roxon announced that the Australian Government would not approach the British Government to seek a pardon for Harry "Breaker" Morant because Morant and his two fellow officers did, in fact, kill unarmed prisoners and others during the Second Boer War.

Resignation
Roxon resigned as Attorney-General on 2 February 2013. She continued as a backbencher for the remainder of her term, and retired when the parliament was dissolved before the 2013 federal election.

See also
 First Rudd Ministry
 First Gillard Ministry
 Second Gillard Ministry

References

External links 
Department of Health and Ageing
2013 Valedictory speech

|-

|-

|-

1967 births
Attorneys-General of Australia
Australian Labor Party members of the Parliament of Australia
Labor Right politicians
Government ministers of Australia
Living people
Members of the Australian House of Representatives
Members of the Australian House of Representatives for Gellibrand
Members of the Cabinet of Australia
Melbourne Law School alumni
Women members of the Australian House of Representatives
Australian people of Polish-Jewish descent
People educated at Methodist Ladies' College, Melbourne
21st-century Australian politicians
21st-century Australian women politicians
Women government ministers of Australia
20th-century Australian politicians
Australian atheists
Australian Ministers for Health
20th-century Australian women politicians